The Zouave is the subject of several sketches and paintings made by Vincent van Gogh in Arles.

Van Gogh was excited to have a model for a portrait, and painted two of the Zouave soldier in June 1888.  Van Gogh described him as a boy, though he is portrayed as older, with a small face, large neck and intense eyes.  A half-length portrait, Le Zouave (half-figure), was made of the tanned man with bright colors he called a "savage combination of incongruous tones".  The Zouave's uniform was blue with red-orange braids, a red cap and two yellow stars on his chest, all placed against the background of a green door and orange bricks.

Van Gogh was not happy with the painting and described it as "ugly and unsuccessful", but thought the challenge might expand his artistic range.  He made a further drawing, with which he was not particularly pleased, and a painting Le Zouave of the soldier against a white wall.

References

External links
Van Gogh, paintings and drawings: a special loan exhibition, a fully digitized exhibition catalog from The Metropolitan Museum of Art Libraries, which contains material on The Zouave (see index)

1888 paintings
Collections of the Van Gogh Museum
Paintings of Arles by Vincent van Gogh
Paintings by Vincent van Gogh